Irina-Camelia Begu and María Irigoyen were the defending champions, however Begu chose to compete at the 2015 Family Circle Cup instead. Irigoyen partnered up with Paula Ormaechea but lost in the first round to Tadeja Majerič and Conny Perrin.

The second seeds, Lourdes Domínguez Lino and Mandy Minella won the title, defeating Mariana Duque and Julia Glushko in the final, 7–5, 4–6, [10–5].

Seeds

Draw

References 
 Draw

2015 ITF Women's Circuit